Gregorio "Greg" C. Laconsay (born March 12, 1931) is a Filipino-Ilocano editor and writer in the Philippines.  He was the former editor in chief for two prominent literary magazines in the Philippines, namely the Ilocano-language Bannawag and the Tagalog-language Liwayway.

Personal life
Greg Laconsay was born in Natividad, Pangasinan.

Literary career
In 1966, Laconsay was the chief editor for the magazine Bannawag. He became an assistant director for editorials at Liwayway Publishing, Inc., and later became the full-pledged overall director for the chain of  Liwayway publications beginning 1977.  He retired in 1991.  He received twenty seven major awards and recognition from different organizations in the Philippines and abroad. He also became a member of the Filipino Academy of Movie Arts and Sciences (FAMAS).

Works

Dictionaries
Iluko–English–Tagalog Dictionary (1993)
Simplified Iluko Grammar (2005)

Ilocano novels
Ti Kabusor (1974)
Ti Love Story ni Theresa (1971) – Theresa's Love Story
Nalagda a Cari (1951)
Rebelde (1957) – Rebel
Villa Verde (1959) – Green Valley
Sacramento (1960) – Sacrament
Purisima Concepcion (1961) – Immaculate Concepcion
Kadena Perpetua (1961) – Perpetual Chain
Kasimpungalan (1962)
Rupanrupa (1963)
Ti Ubing nga Agpateg iti Sangapirgis a Papel (1964)
Dawel (1964)
Littik (1965)
Samuel (1966)
Dagiti Agtawid (1967)
Ti Biddut (1968)
Nympho (1971)

Sex education literature
Lalake at Babae (1974) – Man and Woman
Sex Education sa Modernong Lalaki at Babae (1986) – Sex Education for Modern Man and Woman
Panalo Ka! (1990) – You Win!
My Sexpert Opinion (1984)

See also 

Ilokano literature
GUMIL Filipinas
Ilokano writers
Literature of the Philippines

References 

Ilocano-language writers
Sex educators
Filipino novelists
Ilocano people
Living people
1931 births